The 1998 Taiwanese legislative election were held on 5 December 1998. The result was a victory for the Kuomintang, which won 123 of the 225 seats. Voter turnout was 68.1%.

Results

References

Taiwan
1998 elections in Taiwan
Legislative elections in Taiwan